Canton of Les Abymes-1 is a canton in the Arrondissement of Pointe-à-Pitre on the island of Guadeloupe.

Municipalities
The canton includes part of the commune of Les Abymes.

Representation

Prior to 2015

After 2015

See also
 Cantons of Guadeloupe
 Communes of Guadeloupe
 Arrondissements of Guadeloupe

References

Abymes-1